Fr. Brendan Hoban is an Irish Catholic priest in the Killala Diocese, columnist and author of a number of books. Fr. Hoban was  born in Ballycastle, Co. Mayo in 1948. Educated in Ballycastle Boys National School, St Muredach¹s College, Ballina and entered  St Patrick's College, Maynooth in 1968 and was ordained for the diocese of Killala in 1973. He writes a weekly column in the Western People.

He co-presents  radio show Faith Alive on MidWest Radio each Sunday.

Fr. Brendan is a founding member of the Association of Catholic Priests in 2010, an organisation which states and publishes many controversial opinions which conflict with the doctrine of the Catholic Church.

Fr. Hoban ministered in Ballina and now serves as Parish Priest in Moygownagh, Co Mayo.

Publications
Fr. Hoban has published a number of books.
 'Turbulent Diocese, The Killala Troubles 1798 - 1848' by Hoban, Fr. Brendan, 2011.
 'Where do we go from here' by Hoban, Fr, Brendan, Banley House, Dublin, 2013.
 'A melancholy truth : the travels and travails of Fr Charles Bourke : c. 1765-1820' by Brendan Hoban, Banley House, Dublin, 2008.
 'A touch of the heart : A memoir' by Hoban, Brendan, 2002.

References

1948 births
People from County Mayo
20th-century Irish Roman Catholic priests
Alumni of St Patrick's College, Maynooth
Roman Catholic dissidents
Living people
21st-century Irish Roman Catholic priests